is a Japanese actress and voice actress from Yamagata Prefecture, Japan. In 2011, she received the Seiyu Awards.

Filmography

Anime television
Cyborg 009 (1968) - 003/Francoise Arnoul
Microsuperman (1973) - Ageha
X (2001-2002) - Former Family Head
Ai Yori Aoshi (2002) - Mayu's mother
Naruto (2013) - White Snake Sage
Boruto: Naruto Next Generations (2018) - White Snake Sage

Unknown date
Anne of Green Gables -  Miss Stacy
The Adventures of Pepero  - Pepero
Ie Naki Ko - Barbran Mama
Oniisama e... - Nanako's mother
Kin'iro no Corda - Yunoki's grandmother
Ginban Kaleidoscope - Yukie Mishiro
Crayon Shin-chan - Clover Kindergarten Principal
Legend of the Super Galaxy - Tamara
Chinpui - Yuri Kasuga
Peter Pan no Boken - Elizabeth Darling
Belle et Sébastien - Narration
Detective Conan - Elena Miyano
Lupin III - Linda, Madam X

Animated films
Do It! Yasuji's Pornorama (1971) - Yukiko
Detective Conan: Crossroad in the Ancient Capital (2003) (Tae Yamakura)

Original video animation
Glass Mask (1998) (Utako Himekawa)

Dubbing

Live-action
Jacqueline Bisset
The Life and Times of Judge Roy Bean (Rose Bean)
Murder on the Orient Express (Countess Elena Andrenyi)
Who Is Killing the Great Chefs of Europe? (Natasha O'Brien)
When Time Ran Out (Kay Kirby)
Wild Orchid (1992 TV Asashi edition) (Claudia Dennis)
Domino (Sophie Wynn)
Candice Bergen
Soldier Blue (1976 Fuji TV edition) (Cresta Maribel Lee)
Carnal Knowledge (Susan)
Rich and Famous (Merry Noel Blake)
Gandhi (1987 Fuji TV edition) (Margaret Bourke-White)
The In-Laws (Judy Tobias)
View from the Top (Sally Weston)
Diane Keaton
The Godfather (1976 NTV edition) (Kay Adams-Corleone)
The Godfather Part II (1980 NTV edition) (Kay Adams-Corleone)
The Godfather Part III (VHS and 1994 Fuji TV editions) (Kay Adams-Corleone)
Marvin's Room (Bessie)
Town & Country (Ellie Stoddard)
Crossed Over (Beverly Lowry)
8 Women (Gaby (Catherine Deneuve))
Adaptation (Susan Orlean (Meryl Streep))
Airport 1975 (Nancy Pryor (Karen Black))
Alien (1980 Fuji TV/1981 Laserdisc edition) (Lambert (Veronica Cartwright))
Aliens (1988 TBS edition) (Ripley (Sigourney Weaver))
The BFG (Queen Elizabeth II (Penelope Wilton))
Black Moon Rising (1988 TV Asashi edition) (Nina (Linda Hamilton))
The Brand New Testament (Martine (Catherine Deneuve))
Charmed (Melinda, Julie)
Cinderella (Narrator)
Dancer in the Dark (Cathy (Catherine Deneuve))
The Darjeeling Limited (Patricia (Anjelica Huston))
Desperate Housewives (Stella)
Dracula (1982 TV Asahi edition) (Lucy Seward (Kate Nelligan))
Dune (Lady Jessica (Francesca Annis))
The Evening Star (Aurora Greenway (Shirley MacLaine))
Ghostbusters (Tina)
The Giver (The Chief Elder (Meryl Streep))
Home Alone 2: Lost in New York (1997 Fuji TV edition) (Kate (Catherine O'Hara))
Ironside (Fran Belding)
Jingle All the Way (2000 Fuji TV edition) (Liz Langston (Rita Wilson))
Julie & Julia (Julia Child (Meryl Streep))
Kramer vs. Kramer (Margaret Phelps (Jane Alexander))
Martha Stewart Living (Martha Stewart)
Mission: Impossible (Casey)
Never Say Never Again (Fatima)
Potiche (Suzanne Pujol (Catherine Deneuve))
Prison Break (Caroline Reynolds)
Scanners (1987 NTV edition) (Kim Obrist (Jennifer O'Neill))
Scrooged (Grace Cooley (Alfre Woodard))
Stargate SG-1 (Samantha Carter)
Star Wars: Episode I – The Phantom Menace (Shmi Skywalker (Pernilla August))
Star Wars: Episode II – Attack of the Clones (Shmi Skywalker (Pernilla August))
Superman III (1985 TV Asahi edition) (Lana Lang (Annette O'Toole))
Titanic (Ruth Dewitt Bukater (Frances Fisher))
The Wonder Years (Norma Arnold)

Animation
Josie and the Pussycats (Alexandra Cabot)

References

External links
Official agency profile 

1944 births
Living people
Aoyama Gakuin University alumni
Japanese child actresses
Japanese video game actresses
Japanese voice actresses
Ken Production voice actors
Voice actresses from Yamagata Prefecture
20th-century Japanese actresses
21st-century Japanese actresses